Earl St Aldwyn, of Coln St Aldwyn in the County of Gloucester, is a title in the Peerage of the United Kingdom. It was created in 1915 for the prominent Conservative politician Michael Hicks Beach, 1st Viscount St Aldwyn, known from 1854 to 1907 as Sir Michael Hicks Beach, 9th Baronet, of Beverston. He was Chancellor of the Exchequer from 1885 to 1886 and again from 1895 to 1902. Hicks Beach had already been created Viscount St Aldwyn, of Coln St Aldwyn in the County of Gloucester, in 1906, and was made Viscount Quenington, of Quenington in the County of Gloucester, at the same time he was given the earldom. Both titles are in the Peerage of the United Kingdom. He was succeeded by his grandson, the second Earl, the son of Michael Hicks Beach, Viscount Quenington, Member of Parliament for Tewkesbury, who was killed in action in 1916. Lord St Aldwyn was also a Conservative politician and was Captain of the Honourable Corps of Gentlemen-at-Arms (government chief whip in the House of Lords) between 1958 and 1964 and 1970 and 1974.  the titles are held by his eldest son, the third Earl, who succeeded in 1992.

The Hicks, later Hicks Beach family, descends from Robert Hicks, a textile merchant in London. His third son Baptist Hicks was created Viscount Campden in 1628 and is the ancestor of the Earls of Gainsborough. Robert Hicks's eldest son Sir Michael Hicks was private secretary to William Cecil, 1st Baron Burghley. His only son William Hicks was created a baronet, of Beverston in the County of Gloucester, in the Baronetage of England in 1619. He later represented Marlow and Tewkesbury in the House of Commons. The line of his eldest son, the second Baronet, failed in 1768 on the death of the latter's grandson, the fourth Baronet. The late Baronet was succeeded by his cousin, the fifth Baronet. He was the son of Charles Hicks.

On his death in 1792 this line of the family also failed and the title passed to his cousin, the sixth Baronet. He was the son of Howe Hicks. He was succeeded by his son, the seventh Baronet. When he died in 1834 the title was inherited by his great-nephew, the eighth Baronet. He was the grandson of Michael Hicks Beach, younger brother of the seventh Baronet, who had assumed the additional surname of Beach when he married Henrietta Maria Beach, only surviving daughter and heiress of William Beach of Netheravon, Wiltshire. Hicks Beach briefly represented Gloucestershire East in Parliament in 1854. He was succeeded by his son, the aforementioned ninth Baronet, who was elevated to the peerage as Viscount St Aldwyn in 1906 and created Earl St Aldwyn in 1915.

The family seat was Williamstrip House, near Coln St Aldwyns, Gloucestershire, until its sale in 2007.

Hicks, later Hicks Beach baronets, of Beverston (1619)
Sir William Hicks, 1st Baronet (1596–1680)
Sir William Hicks, 2nd Baronet (1629–1703)
Sir Henry Hicks, 3rd Baronet (1666–1755)
Sir Robert Hicks, 4th Baronet (died 1768)
Sir John Baptist Hicks, 5th Baronet (died 1792)
Sir Howe Hicks, 6th Baronet (1722–1801)
Sir William Hicks, 7th Baronet (1754–1834)
Sir Michael Hicks Hicks Beach, 8th Baronet (1809–1854)
Sir Michael Edward Hicks Beach, 9th Baronet (1837–1916) (created Viscount St Aldwyn in 1906 and Earl St Aldwyn in 1915)

Earls St Aldwyn (1915)
Michael Edward Hicks Beach, 1st Earl St Aldwyn (1837–1916)
Michael Hugh Hicks Beach, Viscount Quenington (1877–1916)
Michael John Hicks Beach, 2nd Earl St Aldwyn (1912–1992)
Michael Henry Hicks Beach, 3rd Earl St Aldwyn (b. 1950)

The heir presumptive is the present holder's brother the Hon. David Seymour Hicks Beach (b. 1955)
The heir presumptive's heir apparent is his son Peter Etienne Hicks Beach (b. 1998)

See also
Earl of Gainsborough
William Wither Bramston Beach
William Frederick Hicks Beach

Notes

References 

Kidd, Charles, Williamson, David (editors). Debrett's Peerage and Baronetage (1990 edition). New York: St Martin's Press, 1990,

External links

Earldoms in the Peerage of the United Kingdom
St Aldwyn
Noble titles created in 1915
Noble titles created for UK MPs
1619 establishments in England